Port Vale F.C. is an English professional association football club based in Burslem, Stoke-on-Trent, Staffordshire. The club was formed in the late 1870s and in 1884 they took the name Burslem Port Vale, dropping the 'Burslem' prefix in 1907. The club joined the English Football League in 1892 as founder members of the Football League Second Division and though they resigned in 1907, they continued to play in North Staffordshire district leagues and would return to the Football League in 1919. The club's first team have competed in numerous nationally and internationally organised competitions, and all players who have played between 1 and 24 such matches are listed below.

Introduction
More than 500 Port Vale players have appeared in between 1 and 24 senior competitive matches. In the early days, the scarcity of nationally organised competitive football meant players could spend many years with the club while making few such outings. However to redress this the list includes appearances in minor cup competitions, such as the Staffordshire Senior Cup, prior to World War II. Exhibition matches were the primary source of games in the early days of the game and so appearances in friendly games during 19th century are also included. This allows club founder Enoch Hood's brothers John and Harry to appear on the list for their friendly appearances in 1879 and 1882.

Jordan Hugill scored five goals in 24 games for the club before being signed by Preston North End in June 2014, though a 20% sell on clause would net the club a £1.8 million windfall when Preston sold him on to West Ham United in January 2018. Strikers Tony Sealy and Alex Jones both scored ten goals in successful loan spells the Vale, helping the players to prove their talent to their parent clubs. David Healy only scored three goals during his loan spell, but would go on to become Northern Ireland's record scorer. Marcus Bent was one of manager John Rudge's last signings and was quickly sold on for a £75,000 profit in October 1999, though would be a £2 million Premier League player at Blackburn Rovers within two years. Dean Smith played 15 games for the Vale at the end of his playing career, and would go on to manager Aston Villa and lead Villa into the Premier League in 2019.

Key

Players with fewer than 25 appearances

Players with more than 24 appearances

References

Soccerbase
Neil Brown stat site

Port Vale F.C. players
Players
 
Association football player non-biographical articles